Arakanese may refer to:
 anything of or relating to Arakan, a region of Myanmar
 anything of or relating to the Kingdom of Arakan, a former kingdom centred in the region
 Arakanese people, an ethnic group of Arakan
 Muslim Arakanese, or Rohingya, another ethnic group of the region
 Arakanese language, a Tibeto-Burman language

Language and nationality disambiguation pages